The Secret of the Lost Tunnel is Volume 29 in the original The Hardy Boys Mystery Stories published by Grosset & Dunlap.

This book was written for the Stratemeyer Syndicate by Andrew E. Svenson in 1950. Between 1959 and 1973 the first 38 volumes of this series were systematically revised as part of a project directed by Harriet Adams, Edward Stratemeyer's daughter. The original version of this book was shortened in 1968 resulting in two different stories with the same title.

Plot summary
The Hardy Boys travel with Brigadier General Jack Smith to a historic Civil War battlefield in the Deep South. Rocky Run Battlefield (near the town of Centerville in an unnamed state) is the center of a legend involving a Confederate general who was disgraced due to his alleged involvement with the theft of gold from a bank.  Smith seeks to vindicate the long-dead officer.

References

The Hardy Boys books
1950 American novels
1950 children's books
1968 American novels
1968 children's books
Grosset & Dunlap books